Vital Anatolyevich Rymasheuski (born 3 March 1975) is a Belarusian politician and one of the presidential candidates at the 2010 presidential elections in Belarus.

Rymasheuski graduated from the Belarusian National Technical University. He was one of the founders of the opposition movement Malady Front in mid-1990s.

In 2005 Rymasheuski, together with other former leaders of the Malady Front, has initiated the restoration of the Belarusian Christian Democracy. He is one of the co-chairmen of the unregistered political party.

During the 2020 Belarusian protests Rymasheuski became a member of the Coordination Council of Sviatlana Tsikhanouskaya.

Vital Rymasheuski is married and has one daughter.

References

External links
 Карані беларускай палітыкі. Віталь Рымашэўскі (The roots of Belarusian politics. Vital Rymasheuski)

1975 births
Living people
Belarusian Christian Democracy politicians
Candidates in the 2010 Belarusian presidential election